Colorado Alliance for Immigration Reform is an activist organization based in Lakewood, Colorado. The group has been listed as an anti-immigrant hate group by the Southern Poverty Law Center.

References

External links 
 CAIR web site

Political organizations based in the United States
Organizations based in Lakewood, Colorado
Anti-immigration politics in the United States